Big Brother Türkiye is the Turkish version of the international Big Brother reality television series. It is the debut season of the show and started broadcasting on 28 November 2015 on Star TV with Asuman Krause hosting the main shows. This season the grand prize is ₺1,000,000.

The winner of the first season is Sinan Aydemir.

The House was located at the Area of the Marma Convention Center in Maltepe.

Schedule

Housemates
On Day 1, sixteen housemates entered the House.

Nominations table

Notes

 This housemate were the current Head of House.
 This housemate were given or won immunity for that week.
 This housemate were automatically put up for eviction by Big Brother.
: Because Oktay became Head of House, he had to choose 3 people. Bad or good things could happen to them. He picked Gökçen, Arsel and Onur respectively. Arsel became nominated for the eviction, Gökçen won immunity for that week and Onur had to stay in the lantern for 6 hours.
: There was a tie between Funda, Gülşen, Rezan and Tuğra. As a Head of House, Oktay had to pick a nominee from those names and he picked Funda.
: Because Alphan, Onur, Sinan broke the rules, they received the automatic nomination. Funda and Yasin's nominations are canceled.
: There was a tie between Oktay and Yasin. As a Head of House, Sinan had to pick a nominee from those names and he picked Oktay.
: There was a tie between Seda and Yasin. As a Head of House, Funda had to pick a nominee from those names and she picked Yasin.
: There was a tie between İdil and Onur. As a Head of House, Sinan had to pick a nominee from those names and he picked İdil.
: There was a tie between Funda and Rezan. As a Head of House, İdil had to pick a nominee from those names and she picked Funda.
: On Day 50, a fortune's wheel appeared in the Big Brother house. Each housemate had to spin one time, Sinan and Hüseyin could pick someone to be the new Head of House and they picked Onur, İdil and Seda could put someone to the nomination, İdil picked Seda and Seda picked Rezan, Rezan could make someone immune for the upcoming week and she picked Gökçen, Funda and Onur could bring one of the evicted housemates back, Funda wanted Çağla to return but later Onur wanted Alphan to return to the house and Alphan returned to the house.
: On Day 57, the housemates voted for the one who they want to leave the house. Seda voted Alphan, Rezan voted Funda and the rest of the housemates voted Seda. She left the house immediately.
: There was a tie between Alphan and Hüseyin. As a Head of House, Arsel had to pick a nominee from those names and he picked Alphan.
: In Week 9, Alphan, Hüseyin, Onur and Sinan made an alliance to evict Rezan. This caused them to be put up for eviction and Big Brother granted Rezan immunity.
: Arsel gave up on the Head of House competition on purpose to let İdil win and İdil became HoH. This caused him to be put up for eviction.
: Seda got the most votes (30%) in the public voting for a Housemate to return to the House. Afterwards, Yasin, who became second in the public voting also returned to the house. 
: On Day 85, after Yasin's eviction, housemates voted to select the first finalist of the season. There was a tie between Arsel (2) and Onur (2), housemates voted between them. By a vote of 3-2, Arsel became the first finalist of the season. Later, Sinan became the second finalist by won the competition.
: This week the public were voting to win, rather than to save.

References

External links
 Official Site
Big Brother Türkiye Videos Site

Turkey
Turkish reality television series